Franca Maï (born Françoise Baud; 26 July 1959 – 8 February 2012) was as French actress and novelist. She is perhaps best known for her role in the Jean Rollin vampire classic Fascination.

Early life
Franca Maï was born Françoise Baud in 1959 in Paris, France and was the eldest of four children, having two younger sisters and a brother. She spent most of her childhood growing up between Paris and Eure-et-Loir.

Career
In 1979, Maï made her film debut when she received the leading role in Jean Rollin's classic vampire tale Fascination, which is considered to be one of the best films in all of Rollin's canon. In Fascination, Maï portrayed the role of 'Elisabeth', a mysterious chambermaid who resides in a deserted château which her lesbian lover (Brigitte Lahaie), when they are encountered by a charming jewel thief (Jean-Marie Lemaire) who takes refuge in the château. What followed was three further feature films, in which she received minor roles; Zig Zag Story, a 1983 comedy written and directed by Patrick Schulmann, Ody Roos' Point mort and finally in 1987, Le moustachu, which was written and directed by Dominique Chaussois. Maï appeared in two television films; Quatre femmes, quatre vies: Des chandails pour l'hiver in 1981 and Les idiots in 1987. She had a guest role in the ORTF and Antenne 2 crime drama series Les enquêtes du commissaire Maigret. In 1988, her final appearance as an actress came when she was cast in the short film Berceaumniaque, which was written and directed by Maï's then life companion Yoram Mevorach Oyoram.

In 1993, she directed, wrote, produced and edited the short film L'an de mes II. Yoram Mevorach Oyoram served as cinematographer and co-editor on the film. In her second short, in 2003, Maï not only directed, wrote, edited the film, she tried her hand at cinematography and performed the song "La chanson du garde-barrière".

In her later life, Maï became a successful novelist. Eight novels were published between 2002 and 2009; Momo qui kills, Jean-Pôl & la môme caoutchouc, Speedy Mata, L’ultime Tabou, Pedro, L’Amour Carnassier, Crescendo and Divino Sacrum: Carnet de bord d’une vieille cancéreuse fripée, respectively. Her final book, Divino Sacrum'', which was written during her long battle with cancer, was published and released posthumously.

Maï was also a successful singer, photographer, poet and the co-creator of a website.

Death
Maï was diagnosed with cancer in 2008. Having gone through long-term chemotherapy and radiation therapy she relapsed. She died on 8 February 2012 at 52 in Villejuif, Val-de-Marne, France.

Filmography

References

External links
 Official site
 

1959 births
2012 deaths
French people of Vietnamese descent
Actresses from Paris
French television actresses
French film actresses
Deaths from cancer in France
20th-century French poets
20th-century French novelists
20th-century French women writers
20th-century French women singers